Al-Arabi H.C (Arabic: نادي العربي السعودي لكرة اليد, English: Al-Arabi Handball Club) is a Saudi Arabian handball team based in Unaizah, that plays in Prince Faisal bin Fahad Saudi Handball League.

Honours

Saudi Federation Handball Cup: 1
1983
Saudi youth handball tournament: 1
1977
Saudi Handball U-17 Premier League: 1
2009
Saudi Handball League First Division: 1
2011

Current squad
Last Update: May 21, 2012

See also 

 Al-Arabi sport club
 Al-Arabi basketball club
 Al-Arabi SC (Kuwait)
 List of handball clubs in Saudi Arabia

Saudi Arabian handball clubs
Sport in Unaizah
Handball clubs established in 1958
1958 establishments in Saudi Arabia